Nemsky District is an administrative and municipal district (raion), one of the thirty-nine in Kirov Oblast, Russia. It is located in the southeast of the oblast. Its administrative center is the urban locality (an urban-type settlement) of Nema. As of the 2010 Census, the total population of the district was 7,983, with the population of Nema accounting for 45.7% of that number.

History
The district was established on June 10, 1929.

References

Notes

Sources



 
Districts of Kirov Oblast
States and territories established in 1929